Oreosoma atlanticum, also known as the ox-eyed oreo, is a species of oreo found in oceanic deep waters. It is the only known member of its genus. Although adults are more similar in shape to other oreos, the juveniles have a distinctive plating/armor in their skin, which is spiked and probably makes them harder to eat for any hostile creature. Adults lack that plating, and, as other oreos, they have a protractile mouth and very large eyes, with small scales.

Description 
The adults are deep bodied and laterally compressed with a strongly humped back They have a small head with large eyes.

The juveniles are dark grey or black in colour with rounded white blotches. Their fins are translucent. They have a rounded stomach with two rows of cone-shaped protrusions. The have another four rows of similar protrusions along their backs. These projections make them highly distinctive.

Distribution and habitat 

References
 

Oreosomatidae
Fish described in 1829
Taxa named by Georges Cuvier